The 2018 Men's EuroHockey Indoor Championship was the eighteenth edition of the Men's EuroHockey Indoor Championship, the biennial international men's indoor hockey championship of Europe organized by the European Hockey Federation. It took place from 12 to 14 January 2018 in Antwerp, Belgium.

Austria won their second title by defeating the hosts Belgium 2–1 in a shoot-out after being tied 4–4 after regular time. Three-time defending champions Germany won the bronze medal by defeating Poland 9–8.

Qualified teams

Umpires

 Lee Barron (ENG)
 Coen van Bunge (NED)
 Johannes Berneth (GER)
 Martin Bucher (SUI)
 Daniel Denta (DEN)
 Michael Eilmer (AUT)
 Ben Goentgen (GER)
 Michael Pontus (BEL)
 Michael Soukup (CZE)
 Lukas Zwierchowski (POL)

Results
All times are local (UTC+1).

Preliminary round

Pool A

Pool B

Fifth to eighth place classification

Pool C
The points obtained in the preliminary round against the other team are taken over.

First to fourth place classification

Semi-finals

Third place game

Final

Final standings

See also
2018 Men's EuroHockey Indoor Championship II
2018 Women's EuroHockey Indoor Championship

References

Men's EuroHockey Indoor Championship
EuroHockey Indoor Nations Championship Men
Sports competitions in Antwerp
International indoor hockey competitions hosted by Belgium
EuroHockey Indoor Nations Championship Men
Men's EuroHockey Indoor Nations Championship
Men 1